FXX is an American basic cable channel owned by the Disney Entertainment unit of The Walt Disney Company through FX Networks, LLC. It is the partner channel of FX, with its programming focusing on original and acquired comedy series and feature films for a primary demographic of men aged 18–34.

FXX launched on September 2, 2013, at 7:00 a.m. ET/6:00 a.m. CT, replacing Fox Soccer. The channel is best known for setting the record for the longest continuous marathon in the history of television. The marathon featured every episode of The Simpsons that had been released at the time and The Simpsons Movie over the course of twelve days. This record has since been broken by VH1 Classic.

As of September 2018, approximately 86.6 million households in the United States (93.9% of those with cable) receive FXX.

History

Development
In January 2013, it was reported by various media outlets that sports-focused channel Fox Soccer would be shut down and be replaced with a general entertainment network that would act as a brother service to FX; while FXX was a possible name from the start, another name proposed for the new net was FX2. The decision appeared to stem from Fox Sports' loss of U.S. television rights to English Premier League soccer matches, rights it shared with ESPN; NBC Sports had secured U.S. rights to the league in October 2012, a deal that took effect at the start of the 2013–14 season. Also likely having an effect on Fox Soccer's future was the eventual conversion of two other Fox Sports specialty channels on August 17, 2013, when the motorsports-oriented Speed became the new general-interest Fox Sports 1 and the extreme sports-heavy Fuel TV converted to Fox Sports 2 (Premier League broadcasts on NBC began that same day).

On March 28, 2013, News Corp.'s FX Networks outlined plans to launch FXX on September 2 which would replace the Fox Soccer channel. The new network would be available in approximately 74 million American homes. FX President John Landgraf said FXX would complete "a suite of three channels" targeting three different demos: FX would aim for viewers 18–49, FXX would seek viewers 18–34, and FXM — the movie network — would go for viewers 25–54. He would oversee all three channels.

In the months leading up to the launch, Fox was generally coy about definitively confirming where FXX would be placed on cable/satellite channel lineups, though Fox officials had indicated off the record that the plan was to indeed replace Fox Soccer with the new network.

Fox Soccer's conversion to FXX took place on the morning of September 2, 2013, leading out of a final airing of Fox Soccer's Being: Liverpool with an hour block of paid programming (which featured a FXX disclaimer card at the front) at 6 a.m. (ET), followed by the proper launch an hour later at 7 a.m. ET.

Launch
The launch clip had FC Barcelona's Lionel Messi about to score a goal (two scenes taken from the UEFA Champions League matches on April 3, 2012 and March 12, 2013) "broken up" before gradually transitioning to a clip of Frank Reynolds (Danny DeVito) of It's Always Sunny in Philadelphia bursting through a leather couch (representing a television screen being "ripped") being "birthed" in the nude (a scene taken from the 2009 Christmas special episode "A Very Sunny Christmas"), suggesting the "birth" of FXX; this led into the pilot episode of Parks and Recreation, the start of an all-day marathon airing of the series. As a result of the rebranding, Fox Soccer's remaining event rights, including CONCACAF and UEFA matches, have moved to Fox Sports 1, Fox Sports 2, or in some cases Fox Soccer Plus.

The channel was intended by Fox to be part of the basic cable lineup, but it started on many providers (including Suddenlink Communications, Comcast, DirecTV, Verizon FiOS, and Charter Communications) in its previous placement within a specialty sports package (along with the costs which come with those packages), a holdover from the channel's previous iteration as Fox Soccer. The vast majority of providers have since moved it to reasonable basic channel positions over time, often next to FX where possible.

A Canadian version of FXX launched on April 1, 2014.

2013–2019: Beginnings
In October 2013, oil company ExxonMobil sued Fox for trademark infringement of its service mark, the interlocking X of its Exxon fuel brand. The network disputed the company's claim that there was the possibility of confusion, with a spokesperson explaining that "we are confident that viewers won't tune into FXX looking for gas or motor oil and drivers won't pull up to an Exxon pump station expecting to get It's Always Sunny in Philadelphia." The parties agreed to dismiss the suit in October 2015.

On November 15, 2013, FXX acquired broadcast syndication rights to the Fox series The Simpsons. Original contracts had previously stated that syndication rights for the series would not be sold to cable until the series conclusion in deference to the local broadcast stations throughout the United States which had carried the series in syndication since the fall of 1993. However, all parties had not projected the series' longevity, nor of the technological advances since 1993.

The series premiered on August 21, 2014, starting with a twelve-day marathon. This featured the first 552 episodes (every single episode that had already been released at the time) aired chronologically, including The Simpsons Movie, which FX Networks had already owned the rights to air. The first day of the marathon was the highest rated broadcast day in the history of the network so far, the ratings more than tripled those of regular prime time programming for FXX. Ratings during the first six nights of the marathon grew night after night, with the network ranking within the top 5 networks in basic cable each night. It was said to be the longest continuous marathon in the history of television, until VH1 Classic broke FXX's record with their nineteen-day marathon of Saturday Night Live.

On December 17, 2014, the network announced it would launch a late-night animation block on January 22. The block would feature fare originally developed and produced by Animation Domination High-Def Studios for Fox. It would launch with eight new episodes of Lucas Bros. Moving Co. and Stone Quackers. “We are insanely excited to partner with FXX and help them create a new block of programming for the network,” said ADHD Studios president Nick Weidenfeld.

For Thanksgiving 2016, FXX launched a 13-day, 600-episode run of The Simpsons in honor of the show's 600th episode. The marathon would include the first four episodes of The Simpsons 28th season (of which was then-current as the season was still being aired by Fox) and ending with the episode "Treehouse of Horror XXVII".

On July 15, 2017, a 2017 CONCACAF Gold Cup soccer game featuring the U.S. men's national team aired on FXX due to sports programming conflicts with Fox and Fox Sports 1; The Washington Post noted that the match was likely placed on FXX rather than Fox Sports 2 due to its broader carriage, as it is available in nearly as many households as FS1, and on basic tiers on some providers.

2019–present: Acquisition by Disney
As part of 21st Century Fox's acquisition by The Walt Disney Company, FX Networks was integrated into the newly renamed Walt Disney Television unit on March 20, 2019.

On April 8, 2019, FX Networks announced its acquisition of off-network rights to Family Guy, starting with its sixteenth season, and Bob's Burgers, starting with its ninth season. Family Guy began airing on FXX on April 16, while Bob's Burgers made its debut on September 24, 2019. FXX shares the rights to Family Guy with new sister networks Freeform and FX. Warner Bros. Discovery's Adult Swim and TBS originally held the cable rights to the prior seasons of both shows; their rights to older seasons of Family Guy expired on September 18, 2021, at which point reruns became exclusive to FX Networks and Freeform, with the rights to Bob's Burgers similarly coming under FX Networks' full control in 2023.

On August 29, 2019, FXX announced Cake, a half-hour series featuring short-form adult animation and live-action content, would premiere September 25. Cake is the network's first original animated program since the aborted pilot of Cassius and Clay and the discontinuation of FXX's Animation Domination High-Def block in 2016.

Shift towards animation
On September 20, 2021, FXX began airing reruns of fellow 20th Television animated shows King of the Hill and The Cleveland Show, and dramatically overhauled the network lineup to air roughly 14 hours of adult animated series every day, save for airings of It's Always Sunny in Philadelphia and Dave, with films only airing in the mornings and early afternoon. This later expanded to roughly 16 hours after FXX began airing Futurama on November 15, 2021, having acquired the off-network rights to that series from NBCUniversal's Syfy (who last aired the series on November 10). FX Networks currently shares the rights to King of the Hill and Futurama with Adult Swim, while also sharing Futurama and (until 2022) The Cleveland Show with Paramount Global's Comedy Central.

FXX ran its first marathon of every Family Guy episode from the first 19 seasons, except "Partial Terms of Endearment", from December 25, 2021 to January 1, 2022, in a similar fashion to their previous multi-day marathons of The Simpsons.

Programming

FXX's original programming consists of comedy series, such as It's Always Sunny in Philadelphia and Archer (both of which previously aired on sister network FX). The network's original series generally air on Wednesday or Thursday nights in the last hour of network primetime. As of September 2021, FXX's acquired lineup (outside programming shared with FX and FXM) consists of film telecasts in the morning and adult animated series airing in the afternoon and evenings.

 Programming blocks 
 Animation Domination – Originally broadcast on Fox as "Animation Domination High-Def", this was a late adult animation block that hosted short-form series such as Axe Cop, Major Lazer, and Stone Quackers.
 Simpsons Sunday''' – A Sunday afternoon block that aired episodes of The Simpsons that have a similar theme to the episode that would air later that night on Fox.

"Every. Simpsons. Ever."
FXX is the cable home of The Simpsons (excluding the Tracey Ullman shorts), of which marathons are aired in primetime. FXX is known for their larger Simpsons marathon events in which the entire run of the series at the time is aired over a number of days.

A third marathon, the "Plus+Size Holiday Marathon," aired from December 17 to 31, 2019, and consisted of 661 episodes, excluding "Stark Raving Dad", and the syndication premiere of The Longest Daycare animated short. The marathon was a promotional event for Disney+, which would become the exclusive streaming service for the series after the shuttering of FX's Simpsons World'' hub.

References

External links
 
 

2013 establishments in the United States
FX Networks
Comedy television networks
Disney television networks
English-language television stations in the United States
Television channels and stations established in 2013
Television networks in the United States
Men's mass media
Men's interest channels